Desmond Whittaker (9 September 1925 – 1966) was an Indian cricketer. He played one first-class match for Bengal in 1954/55.

See also
 List of Bengal cricketers

References

External links
 

1925 births
1966 deaths
Indian cricketers
Bengal cricketers
Sportspeople from Yangon
Indian expatriates in British Burma